Moss Wood is an Australian winery based at Wilyabrup, in the Margaret River wine region of Western Australia.  It is widely regarded as one of the best estates in the region.

History
The first vines were planted at Moss Wood by obstetrician Dr Bill Pannell and his wife Sandra.  The Pannells picked, pressed and bottled the early harvests by hand.  Sandra Pannell tended vines and carted cases of wine to the railhead. Bill Pannell pruned and harvested, sometimes by moonlight.

The 1975 vintage was a major success.  Bill Pannell later described the Cabernet Sauvignon 1975 as "a little miracle".

See also

 Australian wine
 List of wineries in Western Australia
 Western Australian wine

References

Notes

Bibliography

External links
Moss Wood – official site

Wineries in Western Australia
Wilyabrup, Western Australia
Food and drink companies established in 1969
1969 establishments in Australia